Nallambalsamuthitram  is a village in the Arimalamrevenue block of Pudukkottai district, Tamil Nadu, India.

Demographics 

As per the 2001 census, Nallambalsamuthitram had a total population of 906 with 413 males and 493 females. Out of the total population 501 people were literate.

References

Villages in Pudukkottai district